Gertrude Chandler Warner (April 16, 1890 – August 30, 1979) was an American author, mainly of children's stories. She was most famous for writing the original book of The Boxcar Children and for the next eighteen books in the series.

Biography
Warner was born on April 16, 1890, in Connecticut, to Edgar Morris Warner and Jane Elizabeth Carpenter Warner. Her family included an older sister, Frances, and a younger brother, John. Her middle name of Chandler came from her mother's ancestors, the Chandlers, who had settled in nearby Woodstock, CT in 1686. Her father Edgar Warner had graduated from Harvard Law School in 1872 and practiced law in Putnam, CT. The Warners’ house on Main Street was located across from the railroad station.

When she was five, Warner dreamed of being an author. Later she accomplished the dream and started writing The Boxcar Children. Albert Whitman & Company Retrieved and began writing in ten-cent blank books as soon as she was able to hold a pencil.She  wrote an Article on Warner in Something About the Author, Volume 9, ed. Anne Commire, Detroit: Gale Research, 1976, pp. 195–96.</ref> Her first book was an imitation of Florence Kate Upton's Golliwog stories and was titled Golliwog at the Zoo; It "consisted of verses illustrated with watercolors of the two Dutch clocks and the Goliwag. Warner presented this book to her grandfather, and every Christmas afterwards, she would give him a hand-made book as a present.

While growing up, Warner loved to read, and her favorite book was Alice's in Wonderland. Being in a musical family, she was predisposed to play an instrument; in her case, she chose the cello, and her father bought her a cello kit at a young age, however, because of her frequent illnesses, Warner never finished high school. After leaving in her year, she learned from a tutor and finished her secondary education. In 1918, while she was teaching Sunday School, Warner was called to teach first grade, mainly because male teachers were being called to serve in World War I. Warner continued teaching as a grade school teacher in Putnam, Connecticut from 1918–1950. Also during this time, she returned to school for education courses at Yale University summer school.

Warner was a lover of nature. While growing up, she had butterfly and moth collections, pressed wildflowers, learned of all the birds in her backyard and other places, and kept a garden to see what butterflies were doing. She used these interests in teaching her grade school students, and also used nature themes in her books. For instance, in the second book of The Boxcar Children Surprise Island, the Alden children make a nature museum from the flowers, shells and seaweed they have collected and the shapes of birds they have observed. One of her students recalled the wildflower and stone-gathering contests that Warner sponsored when she was a teacher.

As well as her books in The Boxcar Children series, Warner wrote many other books for children, including The World in a Barn (1927), Windows into Alaska 192), The World on a Farm 1931)and Peter Piper, Missionary Parakeet (1967). For adults she wrote Life's Minor Collisions to help adults solve the hard things the adults were going through.

Warner never married anyone. She lived in her parents’ home for almost forty years, then moved to her grandmother's house. In 1962 she moved to a brown-shingled house, Jill C. Wheeler, Gertrude Chandler Warner, Abdo Publishing Co, and lived there with her companion, a retired nurse. In her later life, before she died at age 89, Warner became a volunteer for the American Red Cross, a Cancer Society and other charitable organizations to help kids and adults in need from suffering. She is buried in Grove Street Cemetery, Putnam, CT. Chandler Warner wrote inspiring children's books to inspire kids just like Warner did to him.

The Boxcar Children series
Warner once said that she did much of her writing while convalescing from illnesses or accidents, and that she conceived the idea of The Boxcar Children while sick at home. Of this, she said –

"I had to stay at home from school because of an attack of bronchitis. Having written a series of eight books to order for a religious organization, I decided to write a book just to suit myself. What would I like to do? Well, I would like to live in a freight car, or a caboose. I would hang my wash out on the little back piazza and cook my stew on the little rusty stove found in the caboose."

This original version of The Boxcar Children was published by Rand McNally and Company in 1924. It included 4 color illustrations by Dorothy Lake Gregory. In 1942, Warner rewrote the book with a prescribed vocabulary of six hundred words and a text of about 15,000 words, so that it could be used as a children's school reader. This edition featured numerous black-and-white silhouette illustrations by L. Kate Deal. Warner continued writing other things, but did not continue with The Boxcar Children series until her retirement from teaching. The second book in the series, Surprise Island, was published in 1949.

Warner once acknowledged that The Boxcar Children was criticized for depicting children with little parental supervision; her critics thought that this would encourage child rebellion. Her response was, however, that the children liked it for that very reason. In her books, Warner "liked to stress the Aldens' independence and resourcefulness and their solid New England devotion to using up and making do."

Today, Albert Whitman & Company publishes the extremely popular series of Warner's original 19 stories. Other authors have contributed to the series, adding approximately 150 books to The Boxcar Children series.

In 2020, Gertrude Chandler Warner’s The Box-Car Children,  the first book in the series went into the public domain.

Boxcar Children Museum

On July 3, 2004, the Gertrude Chandler Warner Boxcar Children Museum opened in Putnam, Connecticut. It is located across the street from Warner's childhood home and is housed in an authentic 1920s New Haven R.R. boxcar. The museum is dedicated to Warner's life and work, and includes original signed books, photos and artifacts from her life and career as a teacher in Putman. Included is the desk at which a 9-year-old Warner wrote her first story titled Golliwog at the Zoo. There is also a re-creation of the living space created by the Aldens – the Boxcar Children themselves.

See also

 List of Boxcar Children novels

References

Further reading

External links

Online texts
 
 
 
 Full-Text of the original 1924 version of The Box-Car Children on Gutenberg.org.
 PDF version of the original 1924 version of The Box-Car Children on Archive.org.
 Life's Minor Collisions written with Frances Warner.

About Warner

 Boxcar Children Museum
 
  
 The Box-Car Children (1924 first edition)  presentation by a rare books dealer 
 

1890 births
1979 deaths
American children's writers
Novelists from Connecticut
Place of death missing
20th-century American novelists
American women novelists
American women children's writers
20th-century American women writers
People from Putnam, Connecticut
Schoolteachers from Connecticut
20th-century American women educators
20th-century American educators
Sportspeople from Windham County, Connecticut